List of Merite (Tableau d'honneur) is a 1992 French film directed by Charles Nemes, starring Guillaume de Tonquédec, Claude Jade, Philippe Khorsand and François Berléand.

Synopsis
Jules (Guillaume de Tonquédec) is a student at the Charles Martel college in Saint Germain en Laye, a private school for the lazy children of well-off families. A riotous teenager, but rather passive, particularly in his relations with girls, Jules is secretly in love with Cécile (Cécile Pallas), a pretty girl who attends a nearby state school. Alain Denizet (François Berléand), an assistant teacher at the college, but also an eternally unemployed actor, becomes Jules friend by introducing him to the world of the theatre on Saturdays, a world more relaxed than that of his family. His lovely mother Gabrielle (Claude Jade) is betrayed by her husband Paul (Philippe Khorsand). In a humorous moment, Jules's mom has an embarrassing time shopping for condoms, which she is getting because she is thinking about having an affair with a teacher (Patrick Guillemin) of her son. A former student, Christian Ribet (Eric Elmosnino), violently shatters this fine balance, going as far as to threaten the college's financial situation...

"Contemplating an extramarital affair, Claude Jade attempts to discreetly shop for condoms, a cute twist on what is traditionally a teenage boy's awkward ordeal." (Variety, 1992)

List of Merite is the starting point of three young actors' careers: Guillaume de Tonquédec, Éric Elmosnino and Guillaume Gallienne.

Cast
 Guillaume de Tonquédec: Jules Martin
 Claude Jade: Gabrielle Martin
 Philippe Khorsand: Paul Martin
 François Berléand: Alain Denizet
 Cécile Pallas: Cécile
 Éric Elmosnino: Christian Ribert
 Jean-Paul Roussillon: Croquebois
 Évelyne Buyle: Geneviève Fournet
 Patrick Guillemin: Pierre Vachette
 Kathy Kriegel: Simone Chandeau
 Mathias Mégard: Didier Portman
 Ste´phanie Ruaux: Marijo
 Léa Drucker: Delphine
 Guillaume Gallienne: Castagnier

External links 

1992 comedy films
1992 films
French comedy films
1990s French-language films
1990s French films